London, Midland and Scottish Railway (LMS) Jubilee Class No. 5699 (BR No. 45699) Galatea is a preserved British steam locomotive.

History 
5699 was built at Crewe Works in April 1936 and named Galatea after , which in turn was named after the Galatea of mythology.

From new it was allocated to Newton Heath shed in Manchester where it remained until October 1937 when it was transferred to Millhouses in Sheffield. It was not transferred again until November 1944, when it was allocated to Derby. In 1946, it was transferred to Nottingham and Holbeck, Leeds. After British Railways took over operation of Britain's railway network in 1948, 5699 was renumbered to British Railways number 45699 and in May was transferred to Bristol Barrow Road.

On 16 August 1953, Galatea was derailed while hauling a passenger train at Wilnecote. The derailment was caused by a combination of defects on the locomotive and the condition of the track. The locomotive ended up on its side, but it was hardly damaged and only two people were reported injured.

Its final shed allocation was at Shrewsbury where it remained until November 1964, when it was withdrawn from service. After withdrawal it was stored at Eastleigh Works in December 1964, and remained there until January of the following year when it was moved by rail to Woodham Brothers scrapyard in Barry, Wales.

Allocation history 
The locations of (4)5699 Galatea on particular dates.

Preservation 

Galatea was rescued in April 1980 from Woodham Brothers scrapyard in Barry, South Wales by the late Brian Oliver and was moved to the Severn Valley Railway originally to provide a spare boiler for preserved sister engine 45690 Leander.

45699 was at Tyseley Locomotive Works until 2002 when it was sold to the West Coast Railways and moved to Steamtown Carnforth where it was given a complete rebuild. This also included the manufacturing of a new middle driving wheel after the original was cut through after a shunting accident at Barry Island.

45699 returned to steam in April 2013 on test runs around the Hellifield circle. When 45699 emerged on its first test run it was wearing the identity of its fellow class member No. 5690 Leander. Galatea made its railtour debut on 19 May 2013 working a private charter from King's Lynn to Norwich. 

In May 2014, it made its first ever operational visit to a heritage railway, when it visited the Mid Norfolk Railway at Dereham for their West Coast Railways steam gala, during which it ran alongside fellow Carnforth-based engines LMS Rebuilt Royal Scot 4-6-0 no 46115 Scots Guardsman and LMS Stanier Class 8F 2-8-0 no 48151. All three engines ran in triple-headed formation from Carnforth to Dereham on Thursday 29 May. The three engines then ran during the three day gala from Friday 30 May to Sunday 1 June. The following day, Monday 2 June, the three engines returned to Carnforth along with the nine Mark 1 coaches that had been provided for the gala because most coaches at the Mid Norfolk Railway are air-braked, whereas the three engines and the Mark 1 coaches are vacuum-braked.

In November 2019, 45699 was repainted into British Railways Brunswick green with the late crest and renumbered as scrapped classmate No.45562 'Alberta' after running in British Railways crimson lake livery since April 2013. In July 2021, It had another change of identity and is currently running as No.45627 'Sierra Leone'.

References

External links 

 Jubilees detail
 Railuk database

5699
Preserved London, Midland and Scottish Railway steam locomotives
Locomotives saved from Woodham Brothers scrapyard
Standard gauge steam locomotives of Great Britain